WinVi can refer to:

 WinVi (text editor), Windows text editor based on Vi
 Windows Vista - Microsoft Windows release